Stefania riveroi is a species of frog in the family Hemiphractidae.
It is only known from Yuruaní tepui, a tepui on the border of Venezuela and Guyana. Its habitats are subtropical or tropical moist montane forests, subtropical or tropical high-altitude shrubland, rivers and rocky areas.

References

Stefania
Amphibians of Venezuela
Taxonomy articles created by Polbot
Amphibians described in 1997
Amphibians of the Tepuis